Bashir Tahir born in Bhera, Punjab, Pakistan is a prominent corporate figure in the banking, communication, and real estate sectors of Pakistan.

He is the former CEO of Dhabi Group, a member of the Board of Wateen Telecom and board member and CEO of Warid Telecom International LLC. He is also the former CEO of the Abu Dhabi Group, which is a consortium of investors led by Dhabi Group as the lead investor, and a former Member of the Board Advisory Committee and Board Audit Committee for Bank Alfalah Limited. Previously, Tahir served as general manager and CEO for Union National Bank.

He was until recently a board member of the Board of Investment of Pakistan.

Achievements
Mr. Tahir is a career banker since November 1962; with over forty years experience in finance and Mr. Tahir has over the past 12 years focused on advising and leading private equity and buyout ventures for the members of the UAE royal family and their co-investors. Mr. Tahir is a pioneer for encouraging the collaboration of the various family offices of the ruling families in the region to help form what is now known as the Abu Dhabi Group.

Under the Abu Dhabi Group consortium of investors, Mr. Tahir has been directly responsible for over US$3bn. worth of foreign direct investments into Pakistan's financial and telecommunications sectors. Mr. Tahir has advised on transactions worth US$500m overseas, and has actively led investments into Africa and the CIS, helping the Group to expand its presence into the banking and telecommunications sectors there.

Awards and recognition
 Sitara-e-Imtiaz (Star of Distinction) Award by the President of Pakistan in 2006 in recognition of his contribution to Pakistan's banking sector. 
 Global Pakistani Award as acknowledgement of his services towards building stronger economic ties between the UAE and Pakistan.

Responsibilities
Dhabi Group and Abu Dhabi Group's investments include: Bank Alfalah, United Bank Limited, Warid Telecom (Pakistan, Bangladesh, Republic of Congo, Uganda & Georgia), Wateen Telecom, KOR Standard Bank (Georgia), Raseen Technologies, Al Razi Healthcare, and other investments in the industrial, pharmaceutical and consumer staples sectors.

Mr. Tahir represents the interests of Sheikh Nahyan bin Mubarak Al Nahyan through his board memberships as well as actively monitoring and advising the portfolio companies.

Investment Focus
Tahir helped the Dhabi Group to evolve from a family office engaged in primarily passive investments into a vehicle that acted as a lead investor for a consortium of investors known as the Abu Dhabi Group.  The key focus areas became banking, telecommunications and real estate.

Bashir Tahir was the first to promote and encourage this approach: to be a portfolio investor in a market whereby the country can benefit from inward foreign direct investment that directly helps to create jobs as well as to help attract new investors. This longer-term partnership defined the access and readiness of countries to encourage investment groups that could provide a source of multi-sector investment and help reduce volatilities through such long-term partnerships.

References

External links 
 Board of Investment
 Bank Alfalah
 Warid Telecom
 Wateen Telecom
 Alfalah Exchange
 Alfalah Securities
 Alfalah GHP
 AlRazi Healthcare

Pakistani businesspeople
Living people
Year of birth missing (living people)
Pakistani expatriates in the United Arab Emirates
Recipients of Sitara-i-Imtiaz